John Alban Edwards (born June 10, 1938) is an American former professional baseball player. He played as a catcher in Major League Baseball for the Cincinnati Reds (1961–67), St. Louis Cardinals (1968) and Houston Astros (1969–74). Known for his excellent defensive skills, Edwards was a three-time All-Star and a two-time National League Gold Glove Award winner.

Playing career
Born in Columbus, Edwards graduated from West High School, and then Ohio State University, where he led the team in hits (24) in 1958 and became a member of Phi Kappa Tau fraternity. He was signed as an amateur free agent by the Cincinnati Reds in 1959.

He made his Major League debut at age 23 on June 27, 1961 in a 10–8 Reds' win over the Chicago Cubs at Wrigley Field. In his first at-bat he pinch-hit in the seventh inning for Reds' starting catcher Jerry Zimmerman, drawing a walk against reliever Barney Schultz and later scoring on a triple by Jerry Lynch. In his next at-bat, in the ninth inning, he got his first hit and first RBI, driving in Gordy Coleman with a single against reliever Joe Schaffernoth.

During Edwards' rookie season, he backed up Zimmerman and helped the Reds win the 1961 National League pennant. In the 1961 World Series Edwards had 4 hits and 2 RBIs in a losing cause, as the New York Yankees defeated the Reds in 5 games.

He put up solid offensive numbers from 1962 to 1965, earning three MLB All Star appearances. His offensive numbers diminished after he suffered a broken finger on the last day of spring training in 1966, but he continued to be one of the best defensive catchers in the National League.  On June 14, 1965, Edwards was the Reds catcher when pitcher Jim Maloney went 10 innings against the New York Mets without allowing a hit. Edwards left the game in the 10th inning for a pinch runner with the game in a scoreless tie, as the Mets went on to break up the no-hitter and score a run to win the game in the 11th inning. A little more than two months later, on August 19, 1965, Edwards was once again the catcher as Maloney threw another 10 innings without allowing a hit. This time the Reds scored a run, securing the victory and the no-hitter for Maloney.

With the arrival of Johnny Bench, the Reds traded Edwards to the St. Louis Cardinals for Pat Corrales and Jimy Williams on February 8, 1968. With the Cardinals, he played backup catcher to Tim McCarver, helping them win the National League pennant, however, they would subsequently lose to the Detroit Tigers in the 1968 World Series. He caught Ray Washburn's no-hitter on September 18 of that 1968 season. On October 11, 1968, Edwards was traded with minor league player Tommy Smith to the Houston Astros for Dave Giusti and Dave Adlesh. After playing his first season for the Houston Astros in 1969, he finished 36th in voting for the National League Most Valuable Player Award.

His final game played, at age 36, was a 5–4 10-inning Astros' loss to the Los Angeles Dodgers at the Astrodome on October 2, 1974. In his final plate appearance, pinch-hitting in the 10th inning for Skip Jutze against the Dodgers' Eddie Solomon, Edwards drew a walk.

Career statistics
In a fourteen-year major league career, Edwards played in 1,470 games, producing 1,106 hits in 4,577 at bats for a .242 batting average along with 81 home runs, 524 runs batted in and a .311 on-base percentage. A solid defensive player, he had a career fielding percentage of .992 which was 4 points above the league average, helping him earn the National League Gold Glove Award for catchers in 1963 and 1964

Edwards was voted to three National League All-Star teams in 1963, 1964 and 1965. He led National League catchers in fielding percentage four times in 1963, 1969, 1970 and 1971. He also led the league four times in assists and three times in putouts. In 1969, Edwards set single season records for catchers with 1,135 putouts and 1,221 total chances. 

Richard Kendall of the Society for American Baseball Research devised an unscientific study that ranked Edwards as the second most dominating fielding catcher in major league history. He caught 109 shutouts during his career, ranking him 22nd all-time among major league catchers. As of the end of the 2016 Major League Baseball season he ranked 86th on the All-Time Intentional Walks List.

Personal life
Edwards earned a degree in Engineering from Ohio State. During the off-seasons while with the Reds, he worked as an engineer for General Electric in research and development for nuclear fuel elements.  He was inducted into the Ohio State Varsity O Hall of Fame in September 2008.

References

External links

 Johnny Edwards in Baseball Digest, September 1962
 Johnny Edwards in Baseball Digest, June 1965

1938 births
Living people
Baseball players from Columbus, Ohio
Cincinnati Reds players
General Electric employees
Gold Glove Award winners
Houston Astros players
Indianapolis Indians players
Major League Baseball catchers
Nashville Vols players
National League All-Stars
Ohio State Buckeyes baseball players
Ohio State University College of Engineering alumni
St. Louis Cardinals players
Visalia Redlegs players